David Lovell (born 24 September 1983) is a Bermudian cricketer. Lovell is a right-handed batsman who bowls right-arm medium-fast.

Lovell made a single first-class appearance for Bermuda in 2009 in the Intercontinental Shield against Uganda at the National Stadium, Hamilton. Bermuda won the toss and elected to bat first, making 91 all out in their first-innings, with Lovell being dismissed for 2 runs by Frank Nsubuga. In response, Uganda made 119 all out in their first-innings, with bowling four wicketless overs. Bermuda then made 138 all out in their second-innings, with Lovell scoring 17 runs from 42 balls before he was dismissed by Charles Waiswa. Uganda won the match by seven wickets. This remains his only major appearance for Bermuda.

References

External links
David Lovell at ESPNcricinfo
David Lovell at CricketArchive

1983 births
Living people
Bermudian cricketers